Alfonso "Alfy" Fanjul Jr. (born 1937) is an American billionaire businessman, and the eldest of the Fanjul brothers, who control a sugar and real estate business valued at US$8.2 billion.

Early life
He is the eldest son of Alfonso Fanjul Sr. and his wife Lillian Rosa Gomez-Mena. He has a bachelor's degree from Fordham University in New York.

Career
In 1982, he became chairman of Flo-Sun Land Corporation, the family holding company, following the death of his father.

In 1987, his net worth was estimated at US$500 million.

He and his brother, José Fanjul, both hold Spanish and American passports. They are close friends of the ex-King Juan Carlos and have stated on various occasions that they would be willing to receive the exiled king as a guest in any of their mansions around the world.

Personal life
His divorce from Tina Fanjul, mother of his children, was finalised in 2000 in Florida. She runs Tina Fanjul Associates Inc. Real Estate, which was founded in 1977, and sells property in south Florida and the Dominican Republic.

Their daughter Crista is a marine biology graduate of the University of Miami, and is married to  Allan "Tad" Ryan Jr.

Their youngest daughter, Lillian, is an interior designer, and married to Luis Fernandez. Fernandez is executive vice president and CFO of Florida Crystals, a Fanjul family company, and co-president of American Sugar Refining.

He has been married to Raysa Fanjul since at least 2010.

References

1937 births
People from Havana
People from Palm Beach, Florida
Cuban emigrants to the United States
Fordham University alumni
Businesspeople from Florida
American billionaires
Living people
Fanjul family